was a stage of the Japanese language following Early Middle Japanese and preceding Early Modern Japanese. It was a period of transition in which the language shed many of its archaic features and became closer to its modern form.

The period spanned roughly 500 years from the 12th century to the 16th century and is customarily divided into Early and Late periods. Politically, the first half of Late Middle Japanese was the end of the Heian period, known as Insei and the Kamakura period. The second half of Late Middle Japanese was the Muromachi period.

Background
The late 12th century was a time of transition from the aristocratic society of nobles in the Heian period to the feudal society of the warrior class. Accompanying that change, the political center moved with the establishment of various shogunates in the east.

Various new Buddhist movements began and literacy increased because of their spread.

In the mid-16th century, Portuguese Christian missionaries arrived in Japan. They introduced western concepts and technology but also shared their language. Various Portuguese loanwords entered the language.

In an attempt to spread their religion, the Portuguese missionaries studied and learned Japanese. They created a number of linguistic grammars such as the ‘’Arte da Lingoa de Iapam’’ and dictionaries like the Nippo Jisho and even translated some Japanese literature. Those resources have proven extremely valuable in the study of Late Middle Japanese.

Phonology

Vowels
There were five vowels: /i, e, a, o, u/.

 /i/: 
 /e/: , ?
 /a/: 
 /o/: , ?
 /u/: 

However, it is unclear debated as to how they were realized when they were preceded by a consonant.

/hayaku/ "quickly" > /hayau/:  >  > 
/omou/ "think":  >

Consonants
Late Middle Japanese had the following consonants:

In addition were two phonemes: /N/ and /Q/. "Before a pause, /N/ is a uvular ; it assimilates to the place of articulation of a following stop, affricate, or nasal." "/Q/ becomes a phonetic copy of a following obstruent."

/s, z/, /t, d/, /n/, /h, b/, /p/, /m/, and /r/ could be palatalized.

Labialized consonants /kw, gw/ appeared during Early Middle Japanese. Labialized consonants before -i and -e merged with their non-labial counterparts. Specifically:
/kwi/ > /ki/
/gwi/ > /gi/
/kwe/ > /ke/
/gwe/ > /ge/

The distinction between /ka/ and /kwa/ remained.

The sibilants /s, z/ were palatalized before /i/ and /e/ and had the following distribution:
/sa, za/: 
/si, zi/: 
/su, zu/: 
/se, ze/: 
/so, zo/: 

Note that /se, ze/ has become  in Modern Japanese but retained  for /si, zi/.

/t/ and /d/ were distinguished from the sibilants in all positions but undergo affrication before /i, u/:
/ti, di/: 
/tu, du/:

Prenasalization
Voiced stops and fricatives were prenasalized:
/g/: 
/z/: 
/d/: 
/b/: 

João Rodrigues made that observation in Arte da Lingoa de Iapam. In addition, the Korean text Ch'ŏphae Sinŏ spelled [...] b, d, z, g with the Hangul letter sequences -mp-, -nt-, -nz-, -ngk-" indicating prenasalization.

The effects of prenasalization may also be seen in the transcription of words such as muma < /uma/ "horse" and mube < /ube/ "truly".

/h/ and /p/
Proto-Japanese contained , but by Old Japanese, it had become . In Early Modern Japanese,  became  in many dialects, as it still is.  is found in mimetic words, such as pinpin and patto, as well as in Chinese loanwords such as sanpai and nippon.

Medial /ɸ/ became  before /a/. Before all other vowels, it became silent:
/-ɸa/: 
/-ɸi/: 
/-ɸu/: 
/-ɸe/: 
/-ɸo/:

Glides
/w/ had the following distribution:
/wa/: 
/wi/: 
/we/: 
/wo/: 

The prior merger between /o/ and /wo/ into  during Early Middle Japanese continued into Late Middle Japanese, with /e/ and /we/ merging into  by the 12th century.

/y/ had the following distribution:
/ya/: 
/yu/: 
/ye/: 
/yo/: 

Syllable structure
Traditionally, syllables were of (C)V structure and so there was no need to distinguish between syllables and morae. However, Chinese loanwords introduced a new type of sound that could end in -m, -n, or -t. That structure is the syllable (C)V(C). The mora is based on the traditional (C)V structure.

The final syllables -m and -n were initially distinguished; but by the end of the Early period, both had merged into /N/.

Medial gemination
The final syllables -m, -n, -t before a vowel or a glide underwent gemination and became the consonant clusters -mm-, -nn-, and -tt-.

-m > -mm-:
samwi > sammi "third rank"

-n > -nn-:
ten'wau > tennau >  "Emperor of Japan"
kwan'on > kwannon "Guanyin"
kon'ya > konnya "tonight"

-t > -tt-:
set'in > settin 雪隠 "toilet"
konnitwa > konnitta "as for today"
but'on > button "blessing of Buddha"

Onbin

 are a type of sporadic sound changes and "were not automatic or exceptionless,"  and their exact causes are still debated. They also appear in earlier stages of the language but were particularly prevalent throughout Late Middle Japanese and had a great effect on its verbal and adjectival morphology.

Verbs:
yom- "read": /yomite/ > /yoNde/ 
kuh- "eat": /kuhite/ > /kuute/  :: /kuQte/ 

The kuh- example had two possible outcomes. The former was particular of the western dialects, and the latter was particular of the eastern dialects.

Adjectives:
/hayaku/ "quickly" > /hayau/: [ɸajaku] > [ɸajau] > [ɸajɔː]
/kataki/ "hard" > /katai/ 

In both words, the medial velar -k- became silent by elision.

Morphology
A number of archaic grammatical forms were lost and made the language closer to its modern form.

One of the most prominent developments was the replacement of the conclusive form by the attributive, which has a number of effects:
It was instrumental in changing from bigrade to monograde verbs.
It caused a chain of events in the two adjectival classes that eventually resulted in both merging into one.
It weakened the  system.
The verb ar- "be", which was once irregular, began to regularize as a quadrigrade.

Verbs
Late Middle Japanese inherited all nine verbal conjugations from Early Middle Japanese:

However, throughout the period, bigrade verbs gradually changed into monogrades. The process was completed by Early Modern Japanese, partly a result of the merger of the conclusive and attributive forms.

Adjectives
There were two types of adjectives: regular adjectives and adjectival nouns.

Regular adjectives
The regular adjective was traditionally subdivided into two types: those whose adverbial form ends in -ku and those whose ends in –siku:

There were three notable changes that eventually collapsed the two-way distinction into one:
In Early Middle Japanese, the -siku conclusive develops a -sisi form.
The conclusive and attributive forms merged.
In Late Middle Japanese, adjectival suffix -ki was reduced to -i

While the grammatical distinction between the two classes has disappeared, the historic distinction was used to explain certain present forms of -shii adjectives, notably the euphonic changes (音便) that occur in polite form of adjectives (when they are followed by ござる gozaru 'to be' or 存じる zonjiru 'to know').

Adjectival nouns
There were two classes of adjectival nouns inherited from Early Middle Japanese: -nar and -tar.

The most prominent development was the reduction of attributive -naru to -na. When the conclusive and attributive merged, they both share the new -na. The tar- type becomes more archaic and was continually reduced in distribution. In Modern Japanese, a few naru-adjectives and taru-adjectives remain as fossils.

Hypothetical
The realis base developed into the hypothetical. The realis described something that had already occurred. That usage began to fade and resulted in the use of the hypothetical for events that have not already occurred. Note that Modern Japanese has only a hypothetical and has lost this realis base.

Imperative
The imperative traditionally ended either with no suffix or with -yo. During Late Middle Japanese, -i was attached to lower bigrade, k-irregular, and s-irregular verbs:
kure + i: kurei "give me"
ko + i: koi "come"
se + i: sei "do"

João Rodrigues Tçuzu noted in Arte da Lingoa de Iapam that -yo could be replaced with -ro, as in miyo > miro "look." Note that the eastern dialects of Old Japanese in the 8th century also contained the -ro imperative, which is the standard imperative in Modern Japanese.

Tense and aspect
The tense and aspect systems underwent radical changes. The perfective n-, t-, and r- and the past k-/s- and ker- became obsolete and were replaced by tar- which developed from the perfective aspect into a common past tense. It eventually became ta-, the modern past tense.

Particles
The new case particle de was developed from ni te.

The conjectured suffix -mu underwent a number of phonological changes: mu > m > N > ũ. Combining with the vowel from the irrealis base to which it attached, it then became a long vowel, sometimes with -y- preceding it.

See also
Glossary of Japanese words of Portuguese origin

Notes

References 

 
 
 
 
 Frellesvig, Bjarke (2010). A history of the Japanese language. Cambridge: Cambridge University Press. .
 
 
 
 
 
 
 
 
 
 
 

Japanese language
Archaic Japanese language
Japanese, 1

Languages attested from the 12th century